Liriodendrin is an antiarrhythmic lignan isolated from Pittosporum.

References

Lignans